Société Tunisienne de l'Air, or Tunisair is the national airline of Tunisia.  Formed in 1948, it operates scheduled international services to four continents.  Its main base is Tunis–Carthage International Airport. The airline's head office is in Tunis, near Tunis Airport.

History 

The carrier was formed by the government of Tunisia as Société Tunisienne de l'Air in late 1948. The initial investment was FRF 60 million, with shareholding split between the government (35%), Air France (35%) and another interests (30%). The first managing director of the company was Rene Lefevre.

The route network was expanded along the coast during the early 1950s. In 1951, Casablanca, Ghudamis and Tripoli were incorporated as destinations. The Ghudamis route was terminated in 1952, and the Casablanca run was taken over by Air France the same year. In 1953, the service to Marseilles was extended to Paris. In 1954, a Douglas DC-4 was leased from Air France and used on the route to Paris. At , the fleet comprised three Douglas DC-3s, one Douglas DC-4 and a SNCASE Languedoc. During 1955, the carrier transported 92,344 passengers. At year end, the number of employees was 140. The airline had a revenue of £620,000 for 1955, and costs totalled to £550,000. In 1957 the Tunisian government became the largest shareholder (51%) and the stake held by Air France was reduced to 15%.

The carrier took delivery of its first jet-powered aircraft, a Sud Caravelle III, on 31 August 1961. A new service to Frankfurt was inaugurated in October but it was terminated in March the following year due to poor economical performance. In cooperation with Lufthansa, flights to Frankfurt were restarted in  using Caravelle equipment. The Nord 262 was first put into service in 1969. The introduction of this aircraft into the fleet along with the airline already having two Caravelles in operation allowed the carrier to phase out a DC-3 and two DC-4s.

At this time, they had four Caravelles, two Cessna 402s, a DC-3 and a Nord 262, which were used on domestic services and international routes to Algeria, Belgium, France, Germany, the Netherlands, Italy, Libya, Morocco and Switzerland. Tunis Air took delivery of its first Boeing aircraft, a Boeing 727-200, on 12 March 1972; it was put on service on the Tunis–Paris run. On , a Boeing 707 that was leased from Sabena inaugurated the Tunis–London link. The same day, new services to Luxembourg and Jeddah were launched. In 1973, a third Boeing 727 was ordered for handover in  that year. A fourth and fifth 727 were ordered in 1974 and 1975. The gradual incorporation of the Boeing 727s permitted Tunisair to replace the Caravelles and to retire the remaining DC-3s.

For the first time in its history, in 1995 the carrier started trading its shares at the Tunis stock exchange when 20% of the stake was floated. In , Abdelmalek Larif became the new president. Also in 1999, flights to Amman and Beirut were launched. On  the airline had  employees. At this time the fleet comprised one Airbus A300B4-200, two Airbus A319-100s, ten Airbus A320-200s, four Boeing 727-200 Advanced, three Boeing 737-200 Advanced, four Boeing 737-500s and three Boeing 737-600s that served the following destinations: Abu Dhabi, Algiers, Amman, Amsterdam, Athens, Barcelona, Beirut, Berlin, Bilbao, Bordeaux, Bratislava, Brussels, Budapest, Cairo, Casablanca, Copenhagen, Dakar, Damascus, Djerba, Düsseldorf, Frankfurt, Gafsa, Geneva, Graz, Hamburg, Istanbul, Jeddah, Lille, Linz, Lisbon, London, Luxembourg, Lyon, Madrid, Malta, Marseille, Milan, Monastir, Munich, Nice, Nouakchott, Palermo, Paris, Prague, Rome, Salzburg, Sfax, Stockholm, Strasbourg, Tabarka, Toulouse, Tozeur, Tunis, Vienna, Warsaw and Zurich.

In 2007, Nabil Chettaoui was appointed as chief executive officer (CEO). In June 2011, Hamadi Thamri replaced Chettaoui as president and CEO of the company. In July the same year, Moscow was first served by the carrier with flights to Domodedovo Airport.

Corporate affairs

Ownership and management
The company is 74% owned by the Tunisian government. 
 the CEO is Colonel Elyes Mnakbi, who was appointed by the Ministry of Transport, replacing Mrs Sarra Rejeb, who became head of the SNCFT.

Business trends
Annual reports for Tunisair do not appear to be regularly published; figures can also appear to be inconsistent in industry and press reports. Figures for the Airline (as opposed to the Group) seem to be as shown below (as at year ending 31 December):

Head office 
Tunisair's head office is located on Route X near Tunis–Carthage International Airport in Tunis.

Destinations

Tunisair flies to destinations across Africa, Asia, Europe and North America.  Its main base is Tunis–Carthage International Airport.

Fleet

Current fleet

The Tunisair fleet consists of the following aircraft, :

Historical fleet
Airbus A300-600
Boeing 737-500

Recent developments

Tunisair became the first Airbus A319 customer in both the Arab World and Africa when it ordered three aircraft in October 1997, along with four Airbus A320s. The airline took options on three more aircraft but the specific variants were not informed at that time. The aircraft included in both orders were aimed at replacing the ageing Boeing 727s and 737s in the airline fleet.

Two second-hand General Electric CF6-powered Airbus A300-600R were purchased in 2000; A third aircraft of the type joined the fleet in 2001. An extended range A319 was ordered in 2006. In , Tunisair ordered three Airbus A350 XWBs, along with three Airbus A330-200s and ten Airbus A320s. The order was partially amended in mid-2013, when the airline cancelled the order for the A350. The Airbus order was amended again in 2016, removing an A330 and four A320s and including four Airbus A320neos.

Incidents and accidents 
Tunisair has never experienced a fatal accident since its founding in 1948, but has experienced three hull losses:

 On 12 January 1979, a Boeing 727 was hijacked and diverted to Libya after the hijackers demanded the release of Tunisian trade unionist Habib Achour. In Tripoli, the hijackers surrendered. There were no fatalities.
 On 11 February 1992, a Boeing 727 rolled out of its hangar at Tunis–Carthage International Airport during an engine test due to technicians forgetting to set the aircraft's brakes. The aircraft was damaged beyond repair.
 On 6 February 2013, an Airbus A320 operating as Flight 712 excursed from the runway while landing at Tunis–Carthage International Airport. All 83 people on board survived, but the aircraft was declared a hull loss.

See also

 TunisAir Express
 Transport in Tunisia

Notes

References

Bibliography

External links 

 

Airlines of Tunisia
Airlines established in 1948
1948 establishments in Tunisia
Arab Air Carriers Organization members
Government-owned airlines
Tunisian brands
Companies listed on the Bourse de Tunis
Government-owned companies of Tunisia